Ryan McCay (born 4 May 1986 in Paisley) is a Scottish footballer. He most recently played for Montrose, on loan from the Scottish Premier League side St Mirren.

He has made 10 starting appearances for the Saints, and a further 39 as a substitute. He was unable to play for most of the season 2005–06 due to injury. He scored his only goal for the Buddies against Hearts at Tynecastle in a 3–2 defeat. He signed a one-year extension to his contract before being sent on loan to Stirling Albion. McCay was told in January 2009 that he was free to look for another club (along with Craig Molloy), whilst on loan at Montrose, as his contract would not be renewed in the summer.

References

External links

Living people
1986 births
Footballers from Paisley, Renfrewshire
Scottish footballers
Cowdenbeath F.C. players
St Mirren F.C. players
Stirling Albion F.C. players
Montrose F.C. players
Scottish Premier League players
Scottish Football League players
Association football defenders